Samir Maher Raja Suleiman is a Jordanian footballer who plays for Al-Hussein and Jordan national football team.

International goals

U-16

U-19

References

External links
http://www.kooora.com/default.aspx?player=58066

Living people
Jordanian footballers
Al-Wehdat SC players
Al-Hussein SC (Irbid) players
Al-Ahli SC (Amman) players
Jordanian people of Palestinian descent
1994 births
2015 AFC Asian Cup players
Footballers at the 2014 Asian Games
Association football midfielders
Asian Games competitors for Jordan
Jordan international footballers